The Limitation Act 1939 (2 & 3 Geo.6 c.21) was an Act of the Parliament of the United Kingdom that simplified the law relating to limitation periods in England & Wales. The Act was based on the fifth report of the Law Revision Committee and is divided into 3 parts, with Part I dealing with limitation periods, Part II dealing with exceptions and Part III dealing with general matters.

Section 2 of Part I introduces a new limitation period; six years for all cases in tort and contract. The period runs from the point where the injury or problem was created, not from when it was discovered; thus, the Act replicates problems later solved by the Limitation Act 1963. Part II allows for a "resetting" of the limitation period in situations where the party is insane, not a legal adult or imprisoned for either the death penalty or for penal servitude.

References

Bibliography

United Kingdom Acts of Parliament 1939
Statutes of limitations